Seychelles Cricket Association is the official governing body of the sport of cricket in the Seychelles. Its current headquarters is in Roche Caiman, Seychelles. Seychelles Cricket Association is the Seychelles representative at the International Cricket Council and is an associate member and has been a member of that body since 2010. It is also a member of the African Cricket Association.

References

External links
Official Website
Cricinfo-Seychelles

Cricket administration
Cricket in the Seychelles